"Stop Playing With My Mind" is a 2000 house song recorded by American singer Barbara Tucker (billed as "Ms. Barbara Tucker") featuring singer Darryl D'Bonneau, written and produced by D.J. Freddy Turner and Jason "Whiplash" Hernandez. The track sampled the 1979 Disco song "Mainline" by Black Ivory. This was Tucker's fifth of seven number-one singles she placed on the Billboard Dance Club Songs, reaching the top spot on March 11, 2000. On the UK Chart, the single peaked at 17 in 2000.

Track listing
CD Maxi (US)
 Stop Playing With My Mind (Whiplash & Turner Radio Edit) 3:36  
 Stop Playing With My Mind (Whiplash & Turner Vocal Mix) 9:24  
 Stop Playing With My Mind (Full Intention Club Mix) 7:00  
 Stop Playing With My Mind (Full Intention Dub Mix) 5:13  
 Stop Playing With My Mind (Artful Dodger Vocal Mix) 6:14  
 Stop Playing With My Mind (Artful Dodger Dark Dub) 6:00

References

External links
Live performance from Top of The Pops on YouTube
Live performance from Electric Circus on YouTube

2000 songs
2000 singles
Barbara Tucker songs
Electronic songs
House music songs